Bob Ivy is an American stuntman. He has performed stunts on more than 100 movies, and played the title role in Bubba Ho-Tep.

Actor filmography 

 Bubba Ho-Tep (2002) - Bubba Ho-tep
 The Prophet (1999) - Hunter's Men
 Phantasm IV: Oblivion (1998) - Demon Trooper
 Alien Escape (1997) - Alien
 Dead Tides (1997) - Haim
 Powderburn (1995) - Ranch Fighter
 Round Trip to Heaven (1992) - Liquor Store Thief
 Project Eliminator (1991) - Fighter at restaurant
 Death Chase (1990) - Game Player
 Warlords (1989) - Mutant
 Deep Space (1987) - Hanson
 The Phantom Empire (1986) - Mutant
 Prison Ship (1984) - Trooper #2

External links

Year of birth missing (living people)
Living people
American stunt performers
Place of birth missing (living people)